Julie Palakovich Carr (born April 22, 1983) is an American politician from Maryland. She is a member of the Democratic Party who currently serves in the Maryland House of Delegates, representing District 17 in Montgomery County. She previously served on the Rockville City Council.

Early life and education 
Palakovich Carr was born in Harrisburg, Pennsylvania on April 22, 1983. She attended Boston University, where she earned a B.A. degree in biology in 2005, and the University of Minnesota, where she earned a master's degree in biology in 2007.

Career 
Before holding elected office, Palakovich Carr served on several city task forces, including serving two terms on the Environment Commission, chairing the Adequate Public Facilities Ordinance (APFO) Review Committee, serving as vice chair of the City Services and Budget Work Group, and chairing the Watersheds Committee. In addition to her elected career, Palakovich Carr worked for a decade in science policy, including as public policy manager for the American Institute of Biological Sciences. She also co-founded a political technology startup, Victory Guide, that helps candidates run for local office.

Rockville City Council 
In November 2013, at the age of 29, she became the youngest woman ever elected to the Rockville City Council. She was re-elected in 2015 and served until early 2019. She was council liaison to the Animal Matters Board, Environment Commission, Human Rights Commission, and Traffic and Transportation Commission. During her two terms, Palakovich Carr sponsored successful legislation to make Rockville a sanctuary city, ban smoking in outdoor dining areas, strengthen the city's animal cruelty laws, and create a water conservation program for seniors and low-income families.

In 2016, she was recognized as a Leading Woman by the Annapolis Daily Record for her community involvement and professional accomplishments.

Palakovich Carr announced her candidacy for the Maryland House of Delegates on July 6, 2017. Had she lost the Democratic primary, she would have been eligible to run for re-election on the Rockville City Council. After incumbent Delegate Andrew Platt announced that he would not seek re-election in the 2018 elections, Delegates Kumar Barve and James W. Gilchrist formed a slate with Palakovich Carr in advance of the Democratic primary elections. She won the primary election with 24.7 percent of the vote, and later won the general election with 29.5 percent of the vote. After winning the general election, she resigned from the Rockville city council.

In the legislature 
Palakovich Carr was sworn in as a member of the House of Delegates on January 9, 2019.

Committee assignments 
 Member, Ways and Means Committee, 2019- (local revenues subcommittee, 2019–20; revenues subcommittee, 2019-; education subcommittee, 2021-)
 Joint Audit and Evaluation Committee, 2021-

Other memberships 
 Member, Maryland Legislative Transit Caucus, 2019-
 Member, Women Legislators of Maryland, 2019-
 Associate member, Maryland Legislative Latino Caucus, 2019- (vice-chair, legislative review committee, 2019-)

Political positions

Elections 
During the 2019 legislative session, Palakovich Carr introduced legislation that would replace absentee ballots with vote-by-mail ballots.

During the 2020 legislative session, Palakovich Carr and Dana Stein introduced legislation that would allow gubernatorial candidates to pick their running mates after the primary election. The bill passed the House of Delegates by a vote of 96-41.

During the 2021 legislative session, Palakovich Carr introduced legislation that would expand a law that allows voters to receive paid time off to vote in elections to cover early voting. The bill passed the House of Delegates by a vote of 91-38.

During the 2022 legislative session, Palakovich Carr introduced legislation that would ban lobbyists from contributing from their own personal funds to statewide candidates to influence the actions of these elected officials.

National politics 
In December 2019, Palakovich Carr attended and spoke at a rally in Gaithersburg, Maryland supporting the first impeachment of Donald Trump.

Social issues 
In July 2019, the Maryland State Board of Elections began allowing voters to choose "X" or "unspecified" as a gender on their voter registration after Palakovich Carr wrote to election officials asking them to consider making the corresponding change.

During the 2021 legislative session, Palakovich Carr introduced legislation to ban the use of gay panic defense in criminal court proceedings. The bill passed and went into effect without Governor Larry Hogan's signature.

Taxes 
During the 2019 legislative session, Palakovich Carr introduced and passed legislation that allows the cities of Rockville and Gaithersburg to levy a hotel tax on rental services. She also voted for legislation that would impose fees on tax-capped country club properties in Montgomery County, which failed to pass in an 11-13 vote.

During the 2020 legislative session, Palakovich Carr introduced a tax reform proposal that would require combined reporting for multi-state corporations, eliminate tax credit and subsidy programs, lower the state's estate tax exemption limit to $1 million, and restructure tax brackets for those earning more or less than the state median.

During the 2021 legislative session, Palakovich Carr introduced legislation to extend the state's earned income tax credit to Individual Taxpayer Identification Number filers. The bill passed and became law without Governor Hogan's signature on March 9, 2021.

She also introduced legislation to allow counties to impose progressive income taxes on a bracket basis, which passed but was vetoed by Governor Hogan on May 28, 2021. The General Assembly voted to override the governor's veto during the 2021 special legislative session.

Personal life
Palakovich Carr and her husband, Eric, have lived in East Rockville for a decade. Together, they have a son.

Electoral history

References 

1983 births
Living people
Politicians from Harrisburg, Pennsylvania
People from Rockville, Maryland
Boston University College of Arts and Sciences alumni
University of Minnesota College of Biological Sciences alumni
21st-century American politicians
21st-century American women politicians
Maryland city council members
Women city councillors in Maryland
Democratic Party members of the Maryland House of Delegates
Women state legislators in Maryland